Lancaster Country Day School (LCDS) is a private, secular, coeducational college preparatory school in Lancaster, Pennsylvania, United States. The school has 600 students in preschool through twelfth grade.

History

Founding 
The school was founded in 1908 as a girls' school known as The Shippen School for Girls, the result of a merger between Lancaster College and Miss Stahr's School. In 1943, with the closing of nearby Franklin and Marshall Academy for Boys, the Shippen School changed its charter to become coeducational and adopted its current name. In 1949, it moved to its present location on Hamilton Road.

Headmasters 
 Eleanor Fitzpatrick, 1943–1945
 Rebecca Walton Griest, 1945–1946
 Robert Holt Iglehart, 1946–1949
 John L. Byerly, 1949–1962
 Carl Denlinger, 1962
 Nathaniel Saltonstall II, 1962–1965
 John Jarvis, 1965–1990
 Richard Johnson, 1991–1999
 Mike Mersky, 1999–2007 
 Daphna Ben-Chaim (interim), 2007–2008
 Steven D. Lisk, 2008–2022
 Mattew W. Micciche, 2022-present

School seal 
Lancaster Country Day School has a circular seal done in red ink which illustrates the Red Rose of Lancaster County. Bordering the seal is LCDS' motto in Latin, "fax mentis et cordis incendium gloriae," meaning, "the spark that kindles the mind and heart illuminates a lifetime."

School statistics

Faculty 
84% of LCDS faculty and staff have advanced degrees.

Diversity 
34% of students identify as students of color.

Tuition 
33% of LCDS students receive need-based financial aid.

Academics
LCDS' class size averages 12 students. Country Day's lower school (preschool through fifth grade) includes skill-based grouping for math and reading, and emphasizes art, music, and physical education in parallel with academics. Spanish language instruction begins in preschool. In middle school, Mandarin Chinese, Spanish, and Latin are offered, and students are encouraged to participate in the fine and performing arts. In the upper school, Advanced Placement courses are offered in 15 subjects.

Upper school foreign language courses include Latin, Chinese, French, and Spanish, all of which continue to advanced levels. One hundred percent of the school's graduates are accepted to four-year colleges and universities.

The school provides iPads to students from sixth through twelfth grade. The school retains the ability to view all information on every iPad and to remotely disable certain features. Sixth through eighth graders receive iPads without access to the App Store and with limited Safari functionality.

Harkness discussions 
Originally developed at Phillips Exeter Academy, the Harkess table method is used to encourage students to challenge their reasoning and discussion skills with minimal teacher intervention. Open discussion and collaboration between students is common for all courses at LCDS, but the Harkness method is most often used in the humanities. Common Harkness activities at LCDS include book discussions and debates.

Standardized testing 
LCDS places above the national average in standardized testing. Nationally, the average SAT score is 1068 and the average ACT is 20.8. Pennsylvania's average SAT score is 1086 and ACT score is 23.7. As of 2018, LCDS' average SAT score is 1288 and average ACT score is 29.

Co-curricular activities

Model United Nations 
Since 1980, LCDS has regularly sent senior students to The Hague for International Model United Nations conferences. In 2018 it was one of just seven U.S. schools invited to participate in this annual program, and in 2019 they were the only U.S. school to attend an international conference in Qatar.

Athletics 
LCDS competes in District III of the Pennsylvania Interscholastic Athletic Association (PIAA) and is a member of the Lancaster-Lebanon League. The school sponsors the following sports:

Fall
 (C) Golf
 (G) Field hockey
 (B, G) Soccer
 (G) Tennis

Winter
 (B, G) Basketball
 (B, G) Squash

Spring
 (B, G) Lacrosse
 (B) Tennis

The school has a cooperative agreement with the School District of Lancaster, through which LCDS students can participate in baseball, football, bowling, cross country, swimming, track and field, and wrestling for McCaskey. LCDS students can compete on Lancaster Catholic High School's girls' volleyball team, while students from Lancaster Catholic may join the LCDS boys' and girls' lacrosse teams.

The school mascot is a cougar, and the school colors are maroon and gray. Teams from the school have competed in the PIAA District III and PIAA State playoffs.

Campus

Layout 
Lancaster Country Day School sits on 26 acres of land in the School Lane Hills neighborhood at 725 Hamilton Road. The original nine-acre campus was donated to Lancaster Country Day School in 1949. The academic section of the school consists of three wings. One wing houses the Lower School, constructed in two phases in the 1950s and 1960s; another wing houses the Science Department, constructed in 1960; the third wing houses the Upper School and dining commons as well as several conference rooms, constructed in 2005. The school partners with a local tennis club to allow for the cooperative use of tennis courts on campus. Additionally, the school has five athletics fields, used for various sports and events. A theater, constructed in 1971, sits between the Science Wing and the newer Upper School wing. The school has two gymnasiums, one built in 1975 and the other built in 1991.

Expansion plans 
In 2016, the school completed a round of facility improvements, including a new parking lot and Lower School renovations; new, more welcoming Lower School entrance; air conditioning for the Lower School, science wing and arts center; and a new driveway entrance off N. President Avenue via Clay Street.

In 2017, the school completed a new Physical Education & Athletic Center, which includes new locker rooms, a sports medicine and trainer room, visitor restrooms, fitness center, concessions, a multipurpose dance/yoga/early-childhood studio, and five regulation squash courts with seating for fans.

In 2021, the school opened Gardner Theatre. The new theater features 580 seats, an orchestra pit, state-of-the-art lighting and acoustics and a fly space. The capacity of Gardner Theatre means the school will be able to host performances, graduations, recitals and speakers and that our whole student body is able to enjoy these events together.

Community outreach
 Beginning in the summer of 2015, Lancaster Country Day School began offering the national Horizons program to low-income elementary school students from the school district of Lancaster. Horizons partners with independent schools and colleges to help students keep pace with their peers by minimizing the amount of information they forget during summer vacation.
 Lancaster Country Day's work with Lancaster Area Habitat for Humanity began in 2001 and continues to grow, with the school winning Habitat's 2013 Humanitarian of the Year Award, presented in a celebration dinner on World Habitat Day.
 In addition to time Upper Schoolers spend volunteering at the center, in 2014 the boys' lacrosse team raised more than $1,000 for the Schreiber Pediatric Center in Lancaster.
 The Bangla-Dash fundraiser and race benefiting the Carter Academy in Bangladesh were conceived and implemented by the class of 2017.

Notable alumni
 Alice Rebecca Appenzeller 1915 — first American born in Korea; President of Ewha College (1922–1939)
 Victoria Curtin Gardner Coates 1986 — author and former national security adviser for Senator Ted Cruz
 Michael Deibert 1992 — journalist and author
 Mark Ibold 1980 — musician (bass guitarist), formerly of Pavement and currently Sonic Youth
 Carla Kihlstedt 1989 — musician (violinist, vocalist)
 Rya Kihlstedt 1987 — actress: Nashville, Dexter
 Andrew J. Porter 1990 — author
 Ralph Drake 2016 — Inventor of the Autoblow and Autoblow 2

References

External links
 Official site

Education in Lancaster, Pennsylvania
Private high schools in Pennsylvania
Private elementary schools in Pennsylvania
Private middle schools in Pennsylvania
Schools in Lancaster County, Pennsylvania
1908 establishments in Pennsylvania